Will Taylor (born 4 March 1991) is a Welsh rugby union player. A prop forward, he plays club rugby for Wasps having previously played for the Ospreys regional team.

On 25 March 2015, Taylor returns home as he signed for Welsh region Scarlets ahead of the 2015/16 season.

References

External links
Ospreys Profile
Wasps Profile

Welsh rugby union players
Ospreys (rugby union) players
Wasps RFC players
1991 births
Living people
Rugby union players from Swansea
Scarlets players
Rugby union props